Nummular means something coin-shaped, such as:

Nummular dermatitis
Nummular psoriasis